Reuben Ogbonnaya is a Nigerian professional footballer who plays for Lobi Stars F.C. of Makurdi.

References

1989 births
Living people
Lobi Stars F.C. players
Nigerian footballers
Association footballers not categorized by position